Esben Smed (born 13 July 1984) is a Danish actor. He is best known for his roles in the films Sommeren '92 (2015), A Fortunate Man (2018), and Daniel (2019), as well as the television series Follow the Money (2016–2019).

Filmography

Television

Film

Awards and nominations

References

External links 

1984 births
Living people
Danish male film actors
Danish male stage actors
Danish male television actors
People from Odder Municipality